St. Anthony of Padua Church in Łódź-Łagiewniki - Baroque Franciscan parish church, built in the first half of the 18th century, located in Łódź-Łagiewniki (central Poland). Since 1946 it belongs - along with the monastery - to the historic buildings of Łódź.

History and nowadays 
The church of St. Anthony of Padua was built between 1701 and 1723. It was consecrated on 16 May 1726, by Primate Teodor Potocki, Archbishop of Gniezno. For the next decades, the Franciscan church served as a center of worship for the local Catholics, especially for the pilgrims.

In January 1902, when the new parish was created in Łagiewniki, under the pastoral care of the local Franciscans, the church of St. Anthony of Padua become a parish church. Nowadays, the Franciscan church is known as one of the oldest Baroque buildings in Łódź, and not only as a place of prayer. Every summer musical concerts are organized here, and many young couples decide to arrange a wedding ceremony here.

Architecture of the church 
The Baroque church was built on a plan of the sign of the Latin cross. The facade of the church is two storied. Inside the church there are many valuable elements: main altar (Baroque) of St. Anthony of Padua, chapel of blessed Raphael Chyliński with his coffin, side altars (renovated), Baroque wooden ambo with St. Francis of Assisi painting, etc. Also, there are some valuable paintings and chasubles in the sacristy of the church.

Small photo gallery

Source materials 
 Piotr Mielczarek OFMConv., Łagiewniki - kościół i klasztor Franciszkanów (in Polish). Wydawnictwo Ojców Franciszkanów, Niepokalanów, 1995, 
  Łódź-Łagiewniki location, St. Anthony of Padua Church, etc. (website in English)
  The history of the sanctuary and the church of St. Anthony in Łódź-Łagiewniki (website in Polish)

Churches in Łódź
Baroque church buildings in Poland
Roman Catholic churches completed in 1723
Religious organizations established in 1902
18th-century Roman Catholic church buildings in Poland